Emanuel Lee Lambert, Jr. (born December 15, 1977) is a Christian rapper who goes by the stage name Da' T.R.U.T.H.

Biography 

Lambert is a graduate of Cairn University, formerly Philadelphia Biblical University.

The Faith won a 2007 Stellar Award in the "Rap/Hip Hop Gospel CD of the Year" category. BET, "Lift Every Voice", INSP's "Steelroots", "Mixx Master's Lounge", Revelation TV's "The One to One Show", Word Network's "Bobby Jones Gospel", VIBE, New Man magazine, and Source Magazine have all featured Da' Truth and his music.  He is a close friend of Kirk Franklin and has been on tour with him.

In 2009 Lambert released his fourth album called The Big Picture which features collaborations with Kirk Franklin, Trip Lee, and Tye Tribbett. This project hit No. 1 on the iTunes Christian & Gospel Chart on the day it came out, also reaching No. 1 on the CMTA R&B/Hip Hop Chart, No 2 on the Billboard Gospel chart, and No 4 on the Billboard Contemporary Christian chart during release week.

Personal life 
Lambert is married to Nicole Lambert, and is the father of two daughters.

In 2009, after six months of silence on the issue, Lambert admitted to an extramarital affair with Shanté Tribbett, the wife of Tye Tribbett, a friend and fellow gospel artist, who himself had been caught in an extramarital affair with a woman from his choir. Shanté turned to Lambert, a close friend and confidant, for counseling. Their relationship became sexual, and Lambert later announced that he would temporarily step down from his ministerial role and admitted to disappointing his wife and children. Cross Movement Records, Lambert's first label, suspended the artist following the affair's revelation.

Lambert reconciled with his wife by June 15, 2010, and they celebrated a re-commitment ceremony on their eighth wedding anniversary.

Discography

Studio albums

DVDs

Guest appearances
"No One Greater" by J-Flo
"When You Step" by FLAME
"Sinti (Without You)" by Michelle Bonilla
"Feels Good" by The Ambassador featuring La'Tia & Keran
"L.A.D.I.E.S." by FLAME
"From the Mid to the East Cypha" by FLAME featuring Azriel, E-Licia, J-Silas, J-Son, Phanatik, R-Swift & Thi'sl
"Eternal Cypha" by The Cross Movement featuring J-Silas, Todd Bangz, R-Swift & FLAME
"Spirit Moves (Remix)" by DJ Maj featuring Out Of Eden
"Everyday" featuring Tia Pittman
"The Light" by The Cross Movement
"I Like Me" by Kirk Franklin
"Ridaz" by J.R. featuring Trip Lee & Iz-Real
"Love & Grace" by The Ambassador featuring J.R.
"Identity" by Lecrae featuring J.R.
"Swagged Out With Tags Out" by KJ-52
"I'm Alive Remix" by Jahaziel featuring G KiD & The Ambassador
"J-E-S-U-S" by Anthony Brown & group therapy featuring Michelle Thompson
"Worshipping Tonight" by V. Rose

References

External links
 
 Da Truth "Open Book" New Album Review on Rapzilla
 Cross Movement Records
 Da Truth "The Faith" Album Review on Rapzilla
 Da Truth & Friends DVD Trailer on Rapzilla
  New Da Truth Music Video "Who Am I?" featuring Tye Tribbett on Rapzilla

American performers of Christian hip hop music
Cross Movement Records
American gospel singers
Cairn University alumni
Rappers from Philadelphia
1977 births
Living people
21st-century American rappers